On My Way may refer to:

Film and television
 On My Way (film), a 2013 French film
 "On My Way" (Glee), a television episode

Music

Albums
 On My Way (B.J. Thomas album), 1968
 On My Way (Ben Kweller album) or the title song, 2004
 On My Way (deSoL album) or the title song, 2007
 On My Way (Phil Ochs album) or the title song, 2010
 On My Way, by Split Lip Rayfield, 2017

Songs
"On My Way" (Alan Walker song), 2019
"On My Way" (Axwell and Ingrosso song), 2015
"On My Way" (Charlie Brown song), 2013
"On My Way" (Jennifer Lopez song), 2021
"On My Way" (Lea Michele song), 2014
"On My Way" (Louis Armstrong song), 1959
"On My Way" (Omar Naber song), 2017
"On My Way" (Sheppard song), 2019
"On My Way" (Tiësto song), 2017
"On My Way", by Al King, 1964
"On My Way", by American Analog Set from The Fun of Watching Fireworks, 1996
"On My Way", by Billy Boy on Poison, 2009
"On My Way", by Black Party from Hummingbird, 2022
"On My Way", by Boyce Avenue from All We Have Left, 2010
"On My Way", by Buffalo from Mother's Choice, 1976
"On My Way", by Buzz Clifford (as The Full Treatment), 1967
"On My Way", by Coleman Hawkins from The Hawk Returns, 1954
"On My Way", by DJ Khaled from Victory, 2010
"On My Way", by Drake, a non-album track released to promote Nothing Was the Same, 2013
"On My Way", by Foxes from All I Need, 2016
"On My Way", by Grace Jones from Bulletproof Heart, 1989
"On My Way", by Luna Halo from their 2007 self-titled album
"On My Way", by Jain from Souldier, 2018
"On My Way", by Phil Collins on the soundtrack album Brother Bear, 2003
"On My Way", by Spiderbait from Greatest Hits, 2005
"On My Way", by the Vamps from Night & Day, 2017
"On My Way", by Why Don't We, 2016

See also
I'm on My Way (disambiguation)